Aoife Cusack (born 23 October 1996) is an Irish professional wrestler. She is currently signed to WWE, where she is performing on the NXT brand, under the ring name Lyra Valkyria. She has additionally wrestled under the ring names Valkyrie Cain, Lady Valkyrie, and Valkyrie.

Professional wrestling career

Early career (2015–2020)
After being a student of Fight Factory Pro Wrestling for one year, Valkyrie made her debut in 2015 (adopting the ring name "Valkyrie Cain", after the protagonist of the Skulduggery Pleasant book series by Derek Landy).

WWE (2020–present)
Valkyrie was reported signing with WWE on 20 January 2020, now operating under the ringname "Aoife Valkyrie". However, Valkyrie competed in her first match on NXT UK on 17 January 2020, defeating Amale. She then defeated Isla Dawn the next night on 18 January 2020, and defeated Amale again on the same night. On 26 March 2020, Valkyrie defeated Nina Samuels.

In February 2020, Valkyrie toured with WWE's US-based NXT brand for the first time, wrestling on two house shows in Florida. Valkyrie defeated Aliyah on 14 February in Tampa, followed by defeating Jessi Kamea, MJ Jenkins, and Taynara on 15 February in a six-woman tag team match at a Fort Pierce house show, where she teamed up with Mia Yim and Rita Reis.

Valkyrie made her return to television on the 17 September 2020 episode of NXT UK in a winning effort against Isla Dawn, and on 29 October 2020 she competed against Dani Luna, again in a winning effort. Valkyrie remained undefeated until 29 April 2021 when she lost to Meiko Satomura.

Valkyrie remained with NXT UK until its closing in fall 2022, then moving to the U.S. later in the year to wrestle in NXT under the ring name Lyra Valkyria.

Championships and accomplishments 
 Pro-Wrestling: EVE
 Pro-Wrestling: EVE Tag Team Championship (1 time) - with Debbie Keitel
 Pro Wrestling Ulster
 PWU Women's Championship (1 time)
 Over the Top Wrestling
 OTT Women's Championship (1 time)
 Zero1 Ireland/Fight Factory Pro Wrestling
 Irish Junior Heavyweight Championship (1 time)

References

External links
 

1996 births
Living people
Irish female professional wrestlers
Sportspeople from Dublin (city)
21st-century professional wrestlers
Irish expatriate sportspeople in the United States